Brian Currutt (born April 11, 1974) is an American freestyle skier. He competed in the men's aerials event at the 2002 Winter Olympics.

References

External links
 

1974 births
Living people
American male freestyle skiers
Olympic freestyle skiers of the United States
Freestyle skiers at the 2002 Winter Olympics
Sportspeople from Cleveland